State Road 397 (SR 397) is a  state highway in Okaloosa County, Florida, that runs from Florida State Road 85 on the northern border of Eglin Air Force Base to Florida State Road 85 in western Niceville via Valparaiso. SR 397 is split into two segments by Eglin AFB.

Major intersections

References

External links

FDOT Map of Okaloosa County (Including SR 397)

397
397